Oliver Gordon Watson Mundell (born 1 December 1989) is a Scottish politician of the Scottish Conservative Party. He has been the Member of the Scottish Parliament (MSP) for the Dumfriesshire constituency since 2016. He served as Shadow Cabinet Secretary for Education and Skills from 2021 to September 2022.

Biography 
Born in Irvine, North Ayrshire, Mundell was educated at Moffat Academy and graduated with a first-class Bachelor of Laws from the University of Edinburgh. He was first elected in the 2016 Scottish Parliament election and shortly after was made Scottish Conservative spokesperson for community safety. In the 2016 European Union membership referendum, he campaigned to leave the EU, stating he believed Scotland did not receive a good deal from the Common Agricultural Policy.
Following the 2021 Scottish Election Oliver Mundell was promoted to Shadow Cabinet Secretary for Education.

Personal life 
Mundell's father is Conservative MP David Mundell. He and his father campaigned on opposite sides of the EU referendum. David campaigned for Remain but insisted Oliver was entitled to his own view and the disagreement on this one issue would not affect their relationship.

References

External links 
 
 Profile page on his official website

1989 births
Living people
Place of birth missing (living people)
Alumni of the University of Edinburgh
Conservative MSPs
Members of the Scottish Parliament 2016–2021
Members of the Scottish Parliament 2021–2026